Mimolithophilus is a genus of beetles belonging to the family Coccinellidae.

The species of this genus are found in Southern Africa.

Species

Species:

Mimolithophilus alobatus
Mimolithophilus brevicornis

References

Coccinellidae